Jessie Bartlett Davis (1860 – May 14, 1905) was an American operatic singer and actress from Morris, Illinois, who was billed as "America's Representative Contralto".

Opera and acting
She was born Jessie Fremont Bartlett, one of ten children of farmer and country schoolmaster Elias Lyman Bartlett (b. 1821) and his wife Rachael Ann (née Conklin) Bartlett (b. 1826). After Jessie and her older sister Arabelle "Belle" (1855–74) had become known locally as singers, they were approached by traveling managers and began touring along the West Coast of the United States. Belle died shortly after a tour was arranged. Another sister, Josephine Bartlett Perry (1859–1910) also performed in theater, in the Chicago Ideal Opera Company.

Jessie Bartlett moved to Chicago, where she went on a one-season tour with Caroline Richings. She studied voice in Chicago with Sarah Robinson-Duff, sang in the choir of the Church of the Messiah, and her manager convinced her to join the Chicago Church Choir Company.

In 1879, Bartlett made her debut in the Gilbert and Sullivan opera H.M.S. Pinafore, in the role of Buttercup, in a troop managed by Col. Jack H. Haverly.  On the road the production was managed by Haverly employee, Will J. Davis, whom Bartlett married in 1880. She spent several years with a number of opera companies before joining the Boston Ideal Opera Company. She performed with this troupe until 1901, serving as its prima donna.

Her most famous role was as Alan a-Dale in the 1890 opera Robin Hood by Reginald De Koven and Clement Scott. She introduced the song "Oh Promise Me" which became very popular. She starred in grand operas, including Les Huguenots, Martha, The Merry Wives of Windsor, Il trovatore and Dinorah. She performed with Adelina Patti in Faust while in the James Henry Mapleson Opera company, and toured with them for one season in Europe.

On March 16, 1897, Davis opened on Broadway in The Serenade, playing Dolores. In 1898 she recorded "Don Jose of Sevilla", a duet from The Serenade, with W. H. MacDonald. From October 19 to November 28, 1903, she appeared again on Broadway in a revival of Edward Jakobowski's operetta Erminie.

For her 1902 appearance at Denver, Colorado's, Elitch Theatre, the local newspaper reported: "A characteristically clever stroke of business, and a brilliant achievement on the part of Mary Elitch Long, is the securing of Jessie Bartlett Davis for the production of A Midsummer Night's Dream. The combination is superlatively attractive. Jessie Bartlett Davis has no peer among American singers."

She appeared briefly in vaudeville, where she reportedly earned $1,000 per week.

Songwriter/writer
Jessie Bartlett Davis released the parlor songs collection It's Just Because I Love You So in 1900. The collection reflects the Gay Nineties attitude of the 1890s Victorian era. She helped Carrie Jacobs-Bond launch her songwriting career by volunteering to pay for the cost to publish Seven Songs: as Unpretentious as the Wild Rose, which included the classic wedding song "I Love You Truly."

She was also an author and wrote Only a Chorus Girl, other stories, and a number of poems.

Personal life

In 1880 she married William James Davis, a Chicago theatrical manager, who worked for the Frohman/Klaw/Erlanger theater syndicate and managed Chicago's Iroquois Theatre at the time of the 1903 fire. Jessie had a minor interest in the Iroquois Theater. The Davises had one son who survived infancy, William J. Davis Jr., who as an adult worked with his father in Chicago theater management. The couple had a home on Grand Avenue in Chicago and a summer home in Crown Point, Indiana. Called Willowdale (later named Ellendale), it was where they raised Standardbred trotting horses, collies, and fox terriers. Author and poet Eugene Field was a particular friend and wrote several newspaper columns featuring Jessie and Will. Other friends of the Davises included playwright George Ade, newspaper cartoonist John T. McCutcheon, Australian landowner William Pinkerton, and Civil War hero, Orville T. Chamberlain.

Jessie died unexpectedly of Bright's disease.  She is buried in Oak Woods Cemetery in Chicago.

At the World's Columbian Exposition of 1893, the Fine Arts Building included in its list of exhibits "Bust of Mrs. Jessie Bartlett Davis (Marble) (Lent by Mr. Davis, Chicago)", by Aloys Loeher.

References

External links

portrait of Jessie Bartlett Davis in costume
interview with Jessie Bartlett Davis about her career
husband of Jessie Bartlett Davis - Will J. Davis
son of Jessie Bartlett Davis - Will J. Davis Jr

1860 births
1905 deaths
19th-century American actresses
American stage actresses
American operatic contraltos
Singers from Chicago
People from Morris, Illinois
Deaths from nephritis
People from Crown Point, Indiana
19th-century American women opera singers
Classical musicians from Illinois
Singers from Indiana
Classical musicians from Indiana